Hypolite Taremae (born 4 April 1968) is a Solomon Islands politician.

Biography
Taramae was born in Bagohane Village, Makira Province. After graduating from Honiara Solomon Islands College of Higher Education, he worked as a teacher.

His career in national politics began when he was elected to Parliament as the member for Central Makira in the August 2010 general election, standing as an independent candidate. He was then appointed Minister for National Unity, Reconciliation and Peace in Prime Minister Danny Philip's Cabinet, in the context of the country's efforts towards national reconciliation and unity after the ethnic violence of the late 1990s and early 2000s. When Gordon Darcy Lilo replaced Philip as Prime Minister in November 2011, Taremae retained his position in government.

In January 2012, Taremae was assaulted in a street one evening around midnight, by an unidentified man who punched him on the nose before escaping in a car. The reason for the assault is not known. Suffering from "severe bruises to his nose, eyes and head", Taremae underwent a three-hour operation in hospital.

He lost his seat in the 2014 elections when he was defeated by Nestor Ghiro.

References

1968 births
Living people
Members of the National Parliament of the Solomon Islands
People from Makira-Ulawa Province
Government ministers of the Solomon Islands